Go for It! is a 2011 American musical drama film written and directed by Carmen Marrón and starring Aimee Garcia.

Cast
Aimee Garcia as Carmen Salgado
Al Bandiero as Frank Martin
Jossara Jinaro as Loli
Gina Rodriguez as Gina
Louie Alegria as Pablo
Derrick Denicola as Jared
Andres Perez-Molina as Jesse Salgado

Release
The film was released on May 13, 2011.

Reception
Andy Webster of The New York Times gave the film a positive review, calling it "an unpretentious rite-of-passage drama whose merits belie the banality of its title."

Kimberley Jones of The Austin Chronicle awarded the film two and a half stars out of five, describing it as "earnest and sympathetic but unsophisticated."

Frank Scheck of The Hollywood Reporter gave the film a negative review and wrote that it "never manages to conjure an iota of the joyful exuberance that enlivens even the most formulaic dance films."

References

External links
 
 

2010s English-language films